Borovno is a municipality and village in Plzeň-South District in the Plzeň Region of the Czech Republic. It has about 90 inhabitants.

Etymology
The name was derived from the Czech word borovice, borový les ("pine, pine forest"), which refers to the composition of the local forest at the time of the settlement of the area.

Geography
The western part of the municipal territory with the village lies in the Švihov Highlands, but most of the territory lies in the forested landscape of the Brdy Highlands. The Bradava Stream flows along the southern municipal border and supplies three small ponds.

History
Borovno was founded in the 14th century at the latest, during the settlement of the area by the lords of Rožmitál. Later it was merged with the Mirošov estate and from 1616, it was part of the Spálené Poříčí estate. The greatest development of Borovno occurred at the end of the 18th century, when smelters were established in the vicinity of the village. In the early 19th century, the development ended.

In 1945, at the end of World War II, Borovno was liberated by American troops who stopped their advance here. From 1968 to 1990, a military base of the Warsaw Pact armies was located in the territory of Borovno.

From 1980 to 1990, Borovno was merged with the town of Spálené Poříčí. Since 1 September 1990, the municipality has been separate again.

Demographics

Transport
Main road connecting Plzeň with Tábor runs through the village.

Sights
A remnant of the military base is Javor 51, a unique concrete warehouse that was used to store nuclear munitions. Today it is open to the public as the Atom Museum.

References

External links

Villages in Plzeň-South District